Plectopylis repercussa is a species of air-breathing land snail, a terrestrial pulmonate gastropod mollusk in the family Plectopylidae.

Plectopylis bensoni is the type species of the genus Plectopylis. The specific name bensoni is in honour of malacologist William Henry Benson.

Distribution
This snail occurs in Myanmar.

References

External links
 Gould, A. A. (1856). Descriptions of new species of shells. Proceedings of the Boston Society of Natural History. 6: 11-16
  Pfeiffer, L. (1845). Uebersicht der mit inneren Lamellen versehenen Helix-Arten. Zeitschrift füt Malakozoologie. 2: 81–87.
 Gude, G. K. (1914). Mollusca-II. Trochomorphidae-Janellidae. In: Shipley, A. E. & Marshall, G. A. K. (eds.): The Fauna of British India, including Ceylon and Burma. XII + 520 pp. London (Taylor & Francis)
 Gude, G. K. (1899). Notes on some specimens of Plectopylis. The Journal of Malacology. 7(4): 91
 Páll-Gergely, B. (2018). Systematic revision of the Plectopylinae (Gastropoda, Pulmonata, Plectopylidae). European Journal of Taxonomy. (455): 1–114.

Plectopylidae
Gastropods described in 1914